Wildberries is the largest Russian online retailer founded in 2004 by Tatyana Bakalchuk. Besides Russia, they have services in 15 other countries: Armenia, Belarus, France, Germany, Israel, Italy, Kazakhstan, Kyrgyzstan, Moldova, Poland, Slovakia, Spain, Turkey, the United States and Uzbekistan, with more than 48,000 employees. Wildberries sells 37,000 brands of clothing, shoes, cosmetics, household products, children goods, electronics, books, jewelry, food and much more. The company processes 750,000 orders on average a day online.

History
The company was founded in 2004 by Tatyana Bakalchuk. 
Bakalchuk started the business in 2004 at age 28 in her Moscow apartment while on maternity leave from teaching. She realized how difficult it was for her and other young mothers to shop for clothes for themselves with a newborn at home. Her husband, Vladislav, an IT technician, soon joined her to help build the business.

In 2017 Wildberries became Russia's largest online retailer, surpassing Ulmart. The company, originally based in Milkovo, Moscow Oblast, relocated to Moscow in 2018.

In 2018, Wildberries pulled in $1.9 billion in sales and attracted 2 million daily visitors. Based on Forbes’ analysis, Bakalchuk is worth approximately $1 billion in 2019.

In 2019, Wildberries had revenues for $3 billion with net profit increasing from Rbs1.88bn to Rbs7bn, confirming Wildberries’ leading role in the Russia’s fast-growing $30bn ecommerce market. 

In January 2020, Wildberries started work in the European Union with the launch of sales in Poland. It plans to open about 100 order distribution units in Poland and has opened the first in Warsaw.

The company managed to expand in the aftermath of the 2008 financial crisis, as foreign companies sought to offload their excess inventory at a steep discount.

Forbes Magazine included Bakalchuk to the list "The 10 Most Notable New Billionaires Of 2019".

At the end of the COVID-19 pandemic in 2020, the company reported an increase in sales volumes almost doubled - up to $ 6 billion. About $305 million are accounted for overseas markets.

In February 2021, Bakalchuk bought a small Russian bank Standard Credit (official site). The bank's capital is 302 million rubles, the purchase price is unknown. In Wildberries the bank will be used for settlements with suppliers and for servicing consumer services. In August 2021, the bank was rebranded as Wildberries Bank. In January 2022, Wildberries Bank started withdrawing prepaid virtual bank`s "WB-cards" with a digital wallet.

In April 2021, Wildberries launched an online store in the United States.

Since June 2021, Wildberries has started online sales by instalment and on credit in Russia.

In July 2021, Ukraine imposed sanctions against Wildberries and its owner Tatyana Bakalchuk. Trade in military uniforms and anti-Ukrainian books was named as the reason. The company said it didn't have assets in Ukraine or capital, so sanctions wouldn't harm Wildberries, but only Ukrainian entrepreneurs using its platform. Wildberries told that it sold goods that other foreign players sold in Ukraine. Wildberries accused Ukraine of double standards and discrimination of business. The company's speaker Wildberries didn't expect harm to the company.

In February 2022, the company launched the program of 5 billion roubles to subsidy assistance of merchant discount rate for local sellers providing quick delivery.

On Summer 2022, the company became a kit manufacturer for various Russian Premier League clubs, such as FC Spartak, PFC CSKA and FC Zenit.

References

External links
 

Online retailers of Russia
Russian companies established in 2004
Companies based in Moscow